KBPK (90.1 FM) is a non-commercial radio station that is licensed to Buena Park, California. The station is owned by the Buena Park School District and operated by the Fullerton College Media Studies Department, the campus on which the KBPK studios are located. The public radio station primarily broadcasts an adult contemporary music format as well as various public service programs and special announcements.

History
KBPK was first signed on July 6, 1970, by the Buena Park School District.

In May 1995, KBPK aired Cal State Fullerton Titans baseball games while the team competed in the NCAA postseason tournament.

KBPK broadcast games of the Fullerton Flyers, an independent professional baseball club, during the 2006 Golden Baseball League season.

See also
List of community radio stations in the United States

References

External links

BPK
Mainstream adult contemporary radio stations in the United States
Community radio stations in the United States
Mass media in Orange County, California
Fullerton, California
Buena Park, California